Panther Express is a content delivery network or "CDN" based in New York City. The company was founded in August 2005 by Dwight Merriman, Kevin P. Ryan, Ryan Nitz and Pablo Mayrgundter. All the founders came from DoubleClick, a company co-founded by Dwight and headed by Kevin.

On February 25, 2009, Panther Express and CDNetworks merged.

Investors
2005 — Angel: Dwight Merriman and Kevin P. Ryan provide the undisclosed seed capital.
2006 — Series A: Greylock Partners invests $6 million.
2008 — Series B: Index Ventures, Gold Hill Capital and Grelock Partners invest $15.75 million.
2009 — Merger with CDNetworks

See also
 Content Delivery Network

References

External links
 Panther Express home page
 Akamai & the CDN Price Wars
 Panther Express: CDNs for the little guy

Online companies of the United States
Privately held companies based in New York (state)